Dryopteris sieboldii is a species of fern in the family Dryopteridaceae, native to Japan and south-central and southeast China. It has gained the Royal Horticultural Society's Award of Garden Merit as an ornamental.

References

sieboldii
Flora of South-Central China
Flora of Southeast China
Flora of Japan
Plants described in 1891